Anto Gvozdenović (Serbian Cyrillic: Анто Гвозденовић; 26 January 1853 – 2 September 1935) was a Montenegrin, Russian, and French general, a member of the Imperial Russian Privy Council, and a diplomat and statesman.

Biography
He was the ambassador of Montenegro to the United States of America and was the President (Prime Minister) of the Government-in-exile of Montenegro for two terms and the Regent to Michael, Prince of Montenegro.

References

Further reading

External links
The Njegoskij Fund Public Project : Biography of General Dr. Anto Gvozdenović (1853–1935).

Montenegrin generals
Montenegrin diplomats
People from the Russian Empire of Serbian descent
1853 births
1935 deaths